Anders Björner (born 17 December 1947) received his Ph.D. from Stockholm University in 1979, under Bernt Lindström. He is a Swedish professor of mathematics, in the Department of Mathematics at the Royal Institute of Technology, Stockholm, Sweden. His research interests are in combinatorics, as well as the related areas of algebra, geometry, topology, and computer science.

His other positions included being director of the Mittag-Leffler Institute and editor-in-chief of Acta Mathematica.

Björner is a recognized expert in algebraic and topological combinatorics. He is a 1983 recipient of the Pólya Prize, and is a member of the Royal Swedish Academy of Sciences since 1999.

Books
Oriented Matroids (with Michel Las Vergnas, Bernd Sturmfels, N. White and Günter M. Ziegler), Cambridge University Press, 1993. Second Edition 1999, 560 pages. 
Combinatorics of Coxeter Groups (with F. Brenti), Graduate Texts in Mathematics, Vol. 231, Springer-Verlag, New York, 2005, 367 pages. 
Chapter "Topological Methods" in Handbook of Combinatorics, (eds. Ronald L. Graham, M. Grötschel and László Lovász), North-Holland, Amsterdam, 1995, pp. 1819–1872.

References

External links

1947 births
Living people
21st-century Swedish mathematicians
Academic staff of the KTH Royal Institute of Technology
Members of the Royal Swedish Academy of Sciences
Directors of the Mittag-Leffler Institute
Stockholm University alumni
Combinatorialists
20th-century Swedish mathematicians